Denton Community College is a comprehensive school for boys and girls between the ages of 11 and 16 in Denton, Greater Manchester, England. It was rated as Good by Ofsted in October 2015.

History
The school opened on 1 September 2010, with a new £24 million building being built on the Egerton Park site as part of the borough's £300m Building Schools for the Future project. The school is a merger of two other schools in the area that closed on 31 August 2010:  Egerton Park Arts College and Two Trees Sports College in Denton. The school operated on two sites until 10 January 2012 when the new school building opened to students.

Academic performance
Like all except two schools in Tameside LEA, it has no sixth form.

References

External links
 Website

Secondary schools in Tameside
Community schools in Tameside
Educational institutions established in 2010
2010 establishments in England
Denton, Greater Manchester